Admiral Fitzgerald may refer to:

Charles FitzGerald, 1st Baron Lecale (1756–1810), British Royal Navy rear admiral
Mark P. Fitzgerald (born 1951), U.S. Navy admiral
Robert Lewis Fitzgerald (1776–1844), British Royal Navy vice admiral
Fitzgerald (Star Trek), fictional Starfleet admiral in Star Trek